HNLMS Groningen may refer to the following ships of the Royal Netherlands Navy:

 , a  launched in 1857 and decommissioned in 1863
 , a  launched in 1954 and sold to Peru as BAP Galvez in 1980
 , a  launched in 2011

Royal Netherlands Navy ship names